Renmin Road Subdistrict  is a subdistrict situated in Hualong District, Puyang, Henan, China. , it administers the following ten residential neighborhoods:
Xinghua
Zhenxing
Yongle
Yixing
Guangming
Chonghua
Botouji
Jinrong
Jindi
Zhenhua

See also
List of township-level divisions of Henan

References

Township-level divisions of Henan
Puyang
Subdistricts of the People's Republic of China